Siri Anne Nilsen (born 12 April 1985) is a Norwegian singer-songwriter and voice actress. "As the daughter of two folksingers, Lillebjørn and Shari Nilsen, she grew up surrounded by music." Nilsen is noted for the sincerity of her song writing and the clarity and range of her voice, characterized as "unique" and "beautiful". During her first two albums she often accompanied her singing with a ukulele, which she plays in a fingerpicking style.

Nilsen made her stage debut in 2007, and she was nominated for a Norwegian Grammy in the category of Best Female Artist in December, 2011. Nilsen has had a career for several years as a voice actress, dubbing character roles into Norwegian for several feature films and television, mostly animation.

Biography 

Siri Nilsen was born in Oslo, Norway where she grew up in the borough of Sagene. As a child she appeared in two Norwegian films, one of which, Maja Steinansikt (1996), she co-starred in.

Before deciding to devote herself to music as a career at around the age of twenty, Nilsen was a ballet dancer. At that time she turned to a "secret notebook full of songs that she had been compiling since her early teens" to express herself as an artist. Nilsen first performed publicly at Den Gode Kafe (The Good Cafe) in Oslo, April 2007.

In October 2008, Nilsen won a competition among new artists sponsored by the Norwegian record label, Grappa. In awarding Nilsen the prize for best debut artist, the jury described her as having "the courage to write simple, personal and intimate lyrics in Norwegian". As part of the award, Nilsen received a record contract which produced 2009's Vi som ser i mørket (We Who See in the Dark).

As a voice actress in Norwegian-version feature films and television, Nilsen played Carmen Cortez in Småspioner 2 (Spy Kids 2: The Island of Lost Dreams), Lisa Simpson in The Simpsons Movie, Haru in Katteprinsen  (猫の恩返し Neko no Ongaeshi/The Cat Returns), among others.

Vi som ser i mørket (We Who See in the Dark) 

Released on 5 October 2009, Nilsen's first record, Vi som ser i mørket (We Who See in the Dark), features songs written mostly in Norwegian, but also in English (Nilsen has mentioned that her American mother found it difficult to not want to proofread her English lyrics). The album was produced by musician Jan Martin Smørdal. Music critics were similar in their appraisal of Nilsen's voice and lyrics. Norway's largest newspaper, Aftenposten described Nilsen as "an artist who had already found her own voice." It described her music as ranging from "sensitive melancholy moods to light and playful tones", and "imparting joy and peace of mind.." Nilsen's lyrics are often described as "personal". Remarking on this Nilsen has said that her songs are not completely just about herself but can also be about things that she's observed or heard from others:

Alle snakker sant (They All Speak the Truth) 

Siri Nilsen's second album, Alle snakker sant (They All Speak the Truth), was released 11 November 2011. To produce, Nilsen collaborated with musicians Jens Carelius (a solo artist also part of the group "Blues Run the Game," with Siri Nilsen) and Øyvind Røsrud Gundersen (of the groups Rumble in Rhodos, Hanne Kolstø) both of whom play on the record. Nilsen plays piano, Rhodes piano, guitar, percussion, ukulele and mini-ukulele on the tracks. The album has been described as having a "distinctly modern tone". Nilsen explained that the title (of the album and single) "They All Speak the Truth" refers to reconciling one’s gut feeling with the other messages received from the head and heart; concluding that all three speak the truth.

Nilsen wrote the songs in the dead of winter. She said that at the time the words were meant to comfort her, but by early summer when she recorded them she was already in a different mindset (The tracks were recorded at a rehearsal room next to where she lives).

Aftenposten characterized the album's lyrics as "well written and honest". Nilsen was described by one album reviewer as being "remarkably adept at combining bright colors with subtle hints of darkness," adding, "this usually prevents this light, nimble music from becoming overly cute."

Similar to the previous album, many reviewers focused on Nilsen's voice. The single, "Alle snakker sant", received praise in the pages of The Guardian and among Norwegian music critics. The album was released in the UK on 9 April 2012.

Skyggebokser (Shadow Boxer) 
Released in autumn 2014, the album's title "refers to recurring themes in her work: the dichotomy of not feeling entirely present in your own life, and the feeling of having to fight against different aspects of yourself, while at the same time being drawn to what is fragile and raw." Nilsen describes these songs as "more mature, darker", and the ukulele is almost completely absent.

Other work 
Nilsen released Siri Nilsen: Live fra Rockefeller Music Hall (Siri Nilsen: Live from Rockefeller Music Hall) in August 2012. The tracks were recorded during her concert at the Rockefeller in Oslo the previous March, and features 12 tracks.

Siri Nilsen appears on the Susanna single, "Death Hanging", along with Susanne Sundfør. It was released worldwide on 24 May 2013.

Performer 

In addition to her solo career, Nilsen is part of the Oslo-based musician and poet community, "Blues Run The Game," together with musicians Arild Hammerø and Jens Carelius, among others.

Nilsen sometimes incorporates effects pedals as part of her singing. The pedals enable her to sample elements of her singing which she then loops as a backing track while singing lead.

On 15 December 2011 it was announced that Siri Nilsen had been nominated for a Spellemannprisen (Norwegian Grammy) in the category of Best Female Artist for her album, Alle snakker sant – with the award ceremony being conducted at the National Theatre in Oslo on 14 January 2012.

Nilsen performed at the annual Øyafestivalen (Island festival) on 10 August 2012. The music festival is held at Middelalderparken (Medieval park) in Nilsen's hometown of Oslo, Norway. Nilsen had previously performed there as a backing singer for Jens Carelius. The festival features four stages, and during Nilsen's opening song, "Ta meg med" (Take me with you), it was possible to hear the soundcheck of the black metal band, Nekromantheon, but Nilsen seemed unaffected. Among concert reviews, Nilsen was described by one writer as "a fascinating hybrid of melancholy, vulnerable sweetness and inner strength..." This was Nilsen's first concert since the Rockefeller in March 2012, and since giving birth to a daughter two months previous. Commenting on the most recent phase of her life, Nilsen said, "Now I've also got a million new things to write about, there's so much I want to say."

Nilsen is described as having a "strong artistic presence" and a voice which has a "large register", which is "comfortably clear" with a "steady top and powerful down." Concert reviews of Nilsen's live performances note the clear softness of her voice juxtaposed against her vocal power; and that she can convey more dimensionality with her voice live than what comes across on digitized recordings.

Nilsen performed at the SPOT music festival in Århus, Denmark on 3 May 2013 backed by an orchestra of 30–40 musicians performing some of Nilsen's music such as "Brev" and "Snu, Ikke Snu."

Personal life 

As the daughter of folksingers, Nilsen grew up around music. Her father is Lillebjørn Nilsen (born 1950 Oslo, Norway) who first came to prominence in Norway in the early 1970s after the release of his first albums, and her mother is Shari Nilsen, who is American. Siri Nilsen first wrote a song when she was six years old, but grew up sheltered from the different aspects of the music industry. Lillebjørn tells an anecdote illustrating this point: one day Siri and her sister came home from school and sang a song to their father that they had learned that day, never realizing that it was he who had written it. (Lillebjørn Nilsen wrote a popular song/guitar book that has been in print for decades).

In November 2011, Nilsen performed with her father on the Norwegian late-night talk show, Senkveld med Thomas og Harald (Late Night with Thomas and Harald). She sang the single Alle snakker sant and played the ukulele while Lillebjørn accompanied on ukulele.

In June 2012, Siri Nilsen gave birth to a daughter with Norwegian actor and comedian Anders Bye, with whom she has been in a relationship for several years.

Honors 
2014: Spellemannprisen in the class best lyricist, for the album  Skyggebokser

Discography

Albums 

Live albums
2012: Siri Nilsen: Live fra Rockefeller Music Hall

Singles

Featured in 
2013: "Death Hanging" (Susanna feat. Siri Nilsen & Susanne Sundfør)

Voice acting roles

live acting role in feature film *

References

External links

  
 Siri Nilsen video for Passasjer from the 2014 album, Skyggebokser

Living people
Musicians from Oslo
Norwegian singer-songwriters
Norwegian pop singers
Norwegian voice actresses
Grappa Music artists
1985 births
21st-century Norwegian singers
21st-century Norwegian women singers